Rania Aouina (born 5 May 1994) is a Tunisian footballer who plays as a midfielder for French Division 2 Féminine club Thonon Évian FC and the Tunisia women's national team.

Club career
Aouina has played for Strasbourg Vauban, Saint-Denis and Thonon Évian in France.

International career
Aouina capped for Tunisia at senior level during two Africa Women Cup of Nations qualifications (2014 and 2016).

See also
List of Tunisia women's international footballers

References

External links

1994 births
Living people
People from Medenine Governorate
Tunisian women's footballers
Women's association football midfielders
Thonon Evian Grand Genève F.C. players
Turkish Women's Football Super League players
Tunisia women's international footballers
Tunisian expatriate footballers
Tunisian expatriate sportspeople in France
Expatriate women's footballers in France
Tunisian expatriate sportspeople in Turkey
Expatriate women's footballers in Turkey